Samy and Sandra Sandoval are a brother and sister musical duo from Panama. They perform típico, a form of traditional Panamanian music and Panamanian-style cumbia. They have been praised as patrónes de la cumbia ("masters of cumbia"), and are very popular in Panama.

Early lives and career
Samy was born on 15 February 1968, and Sandra was born on 10 April 1970, to Luis and Dolores Sandoval in Chitré, in the Herrera Province of Panama. At age eight, Samy began to play the accordion, and after listening to songs at home, Sandra began singing. When Samy was eleven and Sandra nine, the two began performing on stage in their native Herrera Province. They slowly gained popularity through performances in other provinces, such as Coclé, Chiriquí, Veraguas, and Los Santos. By age eleven, Samy had entered and won a number of  music and talent contests, though the limited number of fans of típico music in turn limited the duo's popularity. They then made several appearances on Panamanian television networks, such as RTVE and Channel 11, in order to reach a larger audience. At ages fifteen and thirteen, Samy and Sandra began to travel with their band, Ritmo Montañero ("Mountaineer Rhythm"). They became popular with young, middle-class audiences, and their popularity began to surpass that of many other típico stars. Samy and Sandra Sandoval are often credited as having been the first to expose the general public to típico, pindín, and other Panamanian folk musical styles. Their rise in popularity was attributed to Sandra's voice, dance ability, and enthusiasm, as well as Samy's skill at playing the accordion.

Musical hits

The Sandovals' successful songs include "Brindemos por lo nuestro" ("Toast to Ourselves"), "La mujer superficial" ("Superficial Woman"), "Oiga el viejo pá jodé," and "Lo que no da se deja" ("What is ungiving ought to be abandoned"). In 1994, at the Encuentro de Accordeones ("Meeting of Accordions") festival they became popular with the song "La gallina fina" ("The Fine Hen"), which they also performed on the soundtrack for the 2001 movie The Tailor of Panama. They have released a total of fifteen albums, sold more than 30,000 records, and have had a platinum album. They have recorded a duet with Gilberto Santa Rosa, who considered them some of the best performers of tipíca.

Other works

The Sandovals' life stories have been the topic of television shows such as Los compadres, Aires de mi tierra, Hecho en Panamá, and De Mujeres. They also had a small regular role in the television comedy series Los Vergaras. Recently, they have appeared on Univision's Sábado Gigante, and in El Festival de la Calle 8. A quote by Sandra, "No hay mujer fea, sino mujer sin plata" ("There are no ugly women, only women without money"), is now a popular phrase amongst many Panamanians. Samy and Sandra frequently appear at Las Fiestas del Rey Momo. They have performed throughout the United States, the Dominican Republic, and given concerts in Belgium and the Netherlands, performing to audiences of more than 70,000. They have also performed for the Monegasque royalty. They were the subject of biography, Samy and Sandra: The Story, written by Sergio Pérez Saavedra, and a DVD by the same title. It was well received by fans.

Personal lives
Both Samy and Sandra have completed formal education. Samy has a degree in civil engineering; he met his wife Iraida at university. After dating for five years they married on the 14 February 1994. They have two sons, aged twelve and eight. Sandra completed a degree in law and practised as an attorney intermittently. She later decided to devote her time entirely to entertaining and her family. In February 2008, Sandra gave birth to her first child, a boy, whom she named Luis Esteban.

References

External links

Samy and Sandra Sandoval on Myspace

1968 births
1970 births
Panamanian women lawyers
20th-century Panamanian lawyers
Panamanian musical groups
People from Chitré
Sibling musical duos
Living people